Kampung Pahi is a village in Kuala Krai District in the state of Kelantan, Malaysia.

References

Villages in Kelantan